The Kazym Rebellion was a revolt by the Khanty people of western Siberia against the collectivisation policies of the Soviet government in 1933. The revolt was named after the small town of Kazym in the Khanty–Mansi Autonomous Okrug. Some sources describe the events as "Kazym rebellions", listing a series of conflicts starting in 1931, with some half-hearted attempts at reconciliation from Soviet side, but culminating in forceful suppression in 1933 and repression in 1934.

History

In the 1930s, the new settlement of Kazym was established by the government as a "cultural base". In theory, cultural bases were meant to entice the Khanty people into village life with the benefits of schools, hospitals, stores and other communal conveniences. This effort to collectivise native peoples into manageable communities did see a great many Khanty abandoning their forest homes. Still others were relocated forcibly during the Joseph Stalin years. Additionally, compulsory attendance in boarding schools located in towns such as Kazym meant that Khanty children were removed from traditional homes and, for many years, were forbidden to speak their native tongue or follow their cultural beliefs.

This process went alongside the abduction and execution of traditional leaders who were labelled "kulaks" by the state. Eventually there was a revolt in 1933 by many Khanty with support from the Forest Nenets, which was later known as the Kazym rebellion. The revolt began in the lake Numto area and spread to the town of Kazym. Within several weeks it was crushed by the Red Army, which was reported to have slaughtered dozens of villagers and burned their homes. This was the last known conflict with Russia by any of the Siberian tribes.

After that, anyone who took part in the Bear Funeral Rites or other celebrations of Khanty culture was subject to 10 years imprisonment. Bear hunting was forbidden and anything connected with Khant culture, such as sacred ground, pagan shrines or burial grounds were destroyed.

These laws were only relaxed during the 1980s as part of the glasnost policies of Mikhail Gorbachev.

In literature and cinema 
Yeremey Aypin, a writer of Khanty-Mansi descent, wrote a novel titled Our Lady in the blood-splattered snow, which was published in 2002 and served as a basis for a movie named The Khanty Saga produced in 2008. The novel is a fictionalized version of the rebellion.

References

External links
 The Ugric Branch

Conflicts in 1933
Rebellions in Asia
1933 in the Soviet Union
Rebellions in the Soviet Union